Barron's is an American weekly magazine/newspaper published by Dow Jones & Company, a division of News Corp.

Founded in 1921 by Clarence W. Barron (1855–1928) as a sister publication to The Wall Street Journal, Barron's covers U.S. financial information, market developments, and relevant statistics. Each issue provides a summary of the previous week's market activity as well as news, reports, and an outlook on the week to come.

Features
Features in the publication include:
 Market Week – coverage of the previous week's market activity
 Barron's Roundtable – Posts from noted investors such as Bill Gross, Mario Gabelli, Abby Joseph Cohen, Felix Zulauf, and Marc Faber
 Best Online Brokers – A ranking of the top online trading brokerage firms. Criteria include trading experience and technology, usability, mobile, range of offerings, research amenities, portfolio analysis & report, customer service & education, and costs.
 Top Financial Advisors – America's top financial advisors.

History
The magazine has been published by Dow Jones & Company since 1921. The magazine is named after Clarence W. Barron, an influential figure to Dow Jones and a founder of modern financial journalism. Dow Jones also publishes The Wall Street Journal. In 1990, color was introduced to the magazine and full color in January 1996. Barron's introduced a two-section version of the paper on March 7, 1994. 

Barrons.com was launched in 1996 as part of WSJ.com.

In 2005, following "its first redesign in nearly 11 years" Barron's relaunched as a standalone product, months after their first Financial Advisor conference.

In September 2008, Barron's acquired the Winner's Circle Organization. In September 2009, Barron's launched Penta as a new section. The section targets "pentamillionaires", individuals with at least $5 million in assets, with financial advice.

Employees 
Famous former and current editors, publishers, and journalists of the magazine include:

 Robert Bleiberg, publisher (1982–1989), editor (1954–1981)
 Alan Abelson, columnist
 Clarence W. Barron, "father of financial journalism" and founder of the newspaper

See also
 William Peter Hamilton

References

External links

Business magazines published in the United States
National newspapers published in the United States
Dow Jones & Company
Weekly newspapers published in the United States
1921 establishments in the United States
Newspapers established in 1921